The 1971 Bulgarian Cup Final was the 31st final of the Bulgarian Cup (in this period the tournament was named Cup of the Soviet Army), and was contested between Levski Sofia and Lokomotiv Plovdiv on 25 August 1971 at Bulgarian Army Stadium in Sofia. Levski won the final 3–0.

Match

Details

See also
1970–71 A Group

References

Bulgarian Cup finals
PFC Levski Sofia matches
PFC Lokomotiv Plovdiv matches
Cup Final